Your Choice Live Series is a live album by Helios Creed, released on March 15, 1994 through Your Choice Records.

Track listing

Personnel 
Musicians
Helios Creed – vocals, guitar
Chris McKay – bass guitar
Paul Della Pelle – drums
Z Sylver – synthesizer, sampler
Production and additional personnel
Daan van der Elsken – mixing, recording
Peter Reichard – cover art

References

External links 
 

1994 live albums
Helios Creed albums